Georges Paulus (30 January 1896 – 5 July 1937) was a French swimmer. He competed at the 1924 Summer Olympics in the 100 m backstroke event, but failed to reach the final.

References

1896 births
1937 deaths
French male backstroke swimmers
Swimmers at the 1924 Summer Olympics
Olympic swimmers of France